Kevin Axel Larrea Alzamendi (born 19 April 1996) is a Uruguayan footballer who plays as a goalkeeper for Cerrito in the Uruguayan Segunda División.

References

External links
Profile at FOX Sports

1996 births
Living people
Uruguayan footballers
Defensor Sporting players
Boston River players
Rampla Juniors players
Tacuarembó F.C. players
Club Sportivo Cerrito players
Uruguayan Primera División players
Uruguayan Segunda División players
Association football goalkeepers
Footballers from Paysandú